Milan Army Ammunition Plant (MLAAP) was an ammunition plant of the United States Army Joint Munitions Command near Milan, Tennessee and about 23 miles (37 km) north of Jackson, Tennessee.

History
Milan Ordnance Depot and Wolf Creek Ordnance Plant were established in 1941. In 1943, they merged, becoming Milan Ordnance Center (MOC) and later Milan Arsenal (MA) in 1945. In the 1960s, it became MLAAP.

Capabilities 
Capabilities of the center included:  load, assemble and pack ammunition; 40 mm cartridges; mortars and components; artillery projectiles; ignition cartridges; propelling charges; bursters; grenades; Tactical Missile System; demilitarization/disposal; renovation/reclamation; development and production test support; and logistical support.

Facilities 

BRAC 2005 
MLAAP gained the 155 mm artillery and 60 mm, 81 mm, and 120 mm mortar workload from Kansas Army Ammunition Plant. It also gained the 105 mm and 155 mm artillery, Multiple Launch Rocket System and hand grenade, and 60 mm and 80 mm mortar workload from Lone Star Army Ammunition Plant. Both facilities were closed under Base Realignment and Closure 2005.

American Ordnance Involvement 
American Ordnance LLC, operating contractor of Milan Army Ammunition Plant, moved Milan's operations pertaining to ordnance manufacture to Iowa Army Ammunition Plant beginning in 2009. Milan Army Ammunition plant, while still an active facility, no longer produced military ordnance.

Closure 
In August 2019 Joint Munitions Command completed the movement of ammunition and explosive stocks stored at MLAAP and declared the plant no longer required for mission needs. The Army proposes to close and dispose of the approximately 22, 531 acres.

The date that the plant will be vacated is not known.

Environment
MLAAP was placed on the Environmental Protection Agency’s National Priority List (Superfund) in 1987.

Information compiled from

External links
Milan Army Ammunition Plant hunting and fishing website

References 

United States Army arsenals
Historic American Engineering Record in Tennessee
Industrial installations of the United States Army
United States Army logistics installations
Military Superfund sites
Military installations in Tennessee
Buildings and structures in Carroll County, Tennessee
Buildings and structures in Gibson County, Tennessee
United States Army arsenals during World War II
Superfund sites in Tennessee
1941 establishments in Tennessee